The Daimler DK400, originally Daimler Regina DF400, was a large luxury car made by The Daimler Company Limited between 1954 and 1959 replacing their Straight-Eight cars. Distinguished, after the Regina, by its hooded headlights it was Daimler's last car to use their fluid flywheel transmission.

Limousine

The Regina, DF400 and DK400 chassis was generally equipped with steel limousine bodywork by Carbodies (identified as DK400B) with a drop division, three occasional seats and more luxurious trim in the rear compartment than in the DK400A owner-driver car. 

The Regina limousine was shown at the Earls Court Show in October 1954 and then described as being built on a special edition of the Regency chassis. Some chassis were bodied as hearses and at least one was equipped with a coupé body for Lady Docker. 

An unusual feature of the limousine was that the occasional middle seats were three abreast.

Final big straight-six engine, move to a new price class
The DK400 was the last of the larger of the old long-stroke straight six engines that had been traditional on Daimler's smaller cars since 1910 though production of the smaller 3.8-litre engine, modified to take Borg-Warner's automatic transmission, continued until 1962.

The standard wheelbase versions were re-designated DF402. The long wheelbase limousine remained designated DK400 but its name, Regina, was dropped as was the price of the complete standard-bodied limousine, by more than one-third. Modifications to the limousine's engine led to a similar output of 167 hp but at 3,800 rpm.

Final fluid flywheel transmission
The DK400 was the last new Daimler model to use the company's preselector gearbox with fluid flywheel transmission introduced in 1930. A major change in gearing, however, saw the direct-drive top gear replaced by a direct-drive third and an overdrive top. This, intended to improve the car's ability to cruise at high speed with its large engine, could lead to failure because the transmission could not always cope with the torque available from an engine capable of producing  at 3,000 rpm.

It was replaced in the Majestic by a more modern Borg-Warner fully automatic transmission which required modification of the engine and crankcase castings.

Royalty
The DK400 was as much as  lighter than previous postwar Daimlers. Two with Hooper bodies, the limousine in royal livery, were supplied as Royal Stock in 1955 and 1956, the limousine was repainted black and sold in 1958 but the landaulette was used by the Queen Mother.

Afghanistan all-weather tourer

A 4-door all-weather tourer by Hooper, body 10236 on chassis 92724, was specially designed and constructed for Mohammed Zahir Shah, King of Afghanistan.  

By the mid 1990s with the country in political turmoil, the same vehicle, part of the national museum collection, was used as target practice by soldiers and was in a dilapidated state with other vehicles before being taken away and scrapped.

References

External links

Lady Docker's limousine DF400, "Star Dust":
 Star Dust on a Regina DF400 chassis
 more Star Dust
 Star Dust with her owner

Daimler vehicles
Cars introduced in 1955
Luxury vehicles
Limousines
Rear-wheel-drive vehicles